Kankuamo, Cancuamo, or Kankui may refer to:
 Kankuamo people, an ethnic group of Colombia
 Kankuamo language, a language of Colombia
 Kankuamo (spider), a genus of spiders